Biscuit Bear (known in the United States as Ginger Bear) is a children's picture book written and illustrated by Mini Grey, published in 2004. It won the Nestlé Children's Book Prize Gold Award, as well as being shortlisted for the Blue Peter Book Awards and longlisted for the Kate Greenaway Medal.

References

British picture books
2004 children's books
British children's books
Jonathan Cape books
Books about bears